Álex López Morón and Rafael Nadal defeated Todd Perry and Thomas Shimada in the final, 6–1, 6–3.

František Čermák and Julian Knowle were the defending champions, but only Knowle competed that year partnering Lovro Zovko. They lost in the quarterfinals to López Morón and Nadal.

Seeds
Champion seeds are indicated in bold text while text in italics indicates the round in which those seeds were eliminated.

 Massimo Bertolini /  Tom Vanhoudt (semifinals)
 Jaroslav Levinský /  David Škoch (semifinals)
 Julian Knowle /  Lovro Zovko (quarterfinals)
 Todd Perry /  Thomas Shimada (final)

Draw

External links
 2003 Croatia Open Doubles draw

Croatia Open
2003 ATP Tour